Badara Traore (born March 12, 1997) is an American football offensive tackle for the Arizona Cardinals of the National Football League (NFL). He played college football at LSU.

Early life
Traore was born to Bakary Traore and Rouguiatou Kaba, both African immigrants, and grew up in Hyde Park, Massachusetts. He attended Matignon High School, where he played on the football and basketball teams and commuted two hours each way.

College career 
Traore played two seasons at ASA College in Brooklyn, New York. In 2018, he transferred to Louisiana State University to continue his collegiate football career, turning down offers from 26 schools, including Oklahoma, Auburn, and Texas. In his first season at LSU, he played in all 13 games, starting 2 of them, and was referred to as "one of the most improved players on the team" by head coach Ed Orgeron. Going into his senior year, Traore served as the backup right tackle to Austin Deculus and took snaps on special teams. During his final season at LSU, he played in 13 games and earned 3 starts against Georgia Southern, Ole Miss, and Arkansas (one at left tackle and two at right tackle).

Professional career

Chicago Bears
Traore was signed by the Chicago Bears as an undrafted free agent following the 2020 NFL Draft on April 25, 2020. He was waived on September 5, 2020, and was signed to the practice squad the following day. On October 10, 2020, Traore was placed on the reserve/COVID-19 list after testing positive for COVID-19. He signed a reserve/futures contract with the Bears on January 11, 2021. On August 24, 2021, he was waived by the Bears.

Jacksonville Jaguars
On August 25, 2021, Traore was claimed off waivers by the Jacksonville Jaguars. He was waived on August 31, 2021 and re-signed to the practice squad the next day. Traore made his NFL debut on January 9, 2022 against the Indianapolis Colts. He signed a reserve/future contract on January 10, 2022.

On August 29, 2022, Traore was waived by the Jaguars.

Arizona Cardinals
On September 1, 2022, Traore was signed to the Arizona Cardinals practice squad. On October 29, 2022, he was elevated to the active roster. He signed a reserve/future contract on January 11, 2023.

Personal life
Traore graduated from Louisiana State University in 2020 with a bachelor's degree in interdisciplinary studies. He has a younger brother, Boubacar, who currently plays defensive end at Catholic Memorial School in West Roxbury, MA; and is verbally committed to Notre Dame for the class of 2023.

References

External links
Chicago Bears bio
LSU Tigers bio

1997 births
Living people
21st-century African-American sportspeople
Sportspeople from Greater Boston
Players of American football from Massachusetts
African-American players of American football
American football offensive linemen
LSU Tigers football players
Chicago Bears players
Jacksonville Jaguars players
Arizona Cardinals players